Pork jowl is a cut of pork from a pig's cheek.  Different food traditions have used it as a fresh cut or as a cured pork product (with smoke and/or curing salt).  As a cured and smoked meat in America it is called jowl bacon or, especially in the Southern United States, hog jowl or "'joe meat"'. In the US, hog jowl is a staple of soul food, and there is a longer culinary tradition outside the United States; the cured non-smoked Italian variant is called guanciale.

Culinary 
Jowl bacon can be fried and eaten as a main course, similar to streaky bacon, such as in a traditional full English breakfast. Often, it is used as a seasoning for beans, black-eyed peas or cooked with leafy green vegetables such as collard greens or turnip greens in a traditional Southeastern meal. 

Jowl meat may also be chopped and used as a garnish, similar to bacon bits, or served in sandwich form.  Pork jowl can be used as a binding ingredient in pork liver sausages such as liverwurst and braunschweiger.

Traditions in the US 

A Southern US tradition of eating black-eyed peas and greens with either pork jowls or fatback on New Year's Day to ensure prosperity throughout the new year goes back hundreds of years.  During the American Civil War (1861 to 1865), the peas were thought to represent wealth to the Southerners, while the Northern army considered the food to be fit as livestock feed only. Pigs (and by extension, pork products) were symbolic of "wealth and gluttony" and consuming jowls or fatback on New Year's Day guaranteed a good new year.

Storage

Because pork jowl can be cured, like many other cuts of pork, it has been a traditional wintertime food as it is able to be stored for long periods of time without refrigeration.

See also

 List of bacon dishes
 List of smoked foods

References

Cuts of pork
Cuisine of the Southern United States
Soul food
Smoked meat
African-American cuisine